Liwayway Holdings Company Limited, doing business as Oishi, is a snack company based in the Philippines. Its headquarters are in Pasay in Metro Manila. As of 2018, it is headed by Carlos Chan. In China, the company is known as Oishi Shanghaojia (上好佳OISHI).

History
Oishi, started in 1946 as Liwayway, was originally a family-owned corn starch and coffee repacking business. The name of the business, "Liwayway," meaning "dawn" in Tagalog, was selected to reflect the optimism of the Philippines following the aftermath of World War II. By 1966, in addition to distributing starch, the company also was distributing basic commodities, coffee, and confectioneries. It was incorporated as the Liwayway Marketing Corporation (LMC) in 1966.

Brothers Carlos and Manuel Chan, at the time, were behind the company. Their brother Ben is the founder of Bench, a Philippine clothing brand. As Chinese Filipinos, the parents of the Chan brothers are immigrants to the Philippines from Jinjiang county, Quanzhou, Fujian Province, China.

The company began distributing Oishi Prawn Crackers and Kirei Yummy Flakes in 1974. The company claims to have used technology from Japan to make the products.

Expansion
Carlos Chan began prospecting on the expansion of Oishi to China in 1984, following the liberalization of the Chinese economy under Deng Xiaoping starting in 1978. Liwayway went under the name Oishi Shanghaojia, appending "Shanghaojia" (上好佳) to Oishi which means "top grade and high quality" in Chinese. It entered a joint venture with two state-owned Chinese firms and opened its first overseas manufacturing plant in Pudong, Shanghai The company's China division set up its headquarters in Qingpu District, Shanghai. To improve distribution in China, the company established a factory network there. Oishi also established a presence in Vietnam in 1997 and in Myanmar in 1999. In 2006, factories were opened in Indonesia and Thailand.

Interlink Direct Ltd. imports Oishi products from China to the United Kingdom.

Reception
In 2006, Oishi Shanghaojia was recognized as a "China Famous Brand". It was also the first non-Chinese company to be given the "Shanghai Famous Brand Award".

References

External links
 Oishi
 Oishi China
 Oishi China (oishi-tm.com) (Archive)
 San Juan, Thelma Sioson. "The Pinoy chips that conquered China." Philippine Daily Inquirer. Sunday March 18, 2012.

Drink companies of the Philippines
Snack food manufacturers of the Philippines
Food and drink companies of the Philippines
Companies based in Pasay
Food and drink companies established in 1946
Philippine brands